Constantine Roussos (also known as Constantinos Roussos) was born in Limassol, Cyprus. Roussos is an entrepreneur, domainer and musician.

Early years
As part of his mandatory military service, Roussos enrolled to the Cypriot National Guard and joined the Special Forces as a Green Beret officer also known as LOK (Greek: ΛΟΚ – Λόχοι Ορεινών Καταδρομών, Lochoi Oreinōn Katadromōn). All LOK Groups are part of the Army Special Forces Command DKD (Greek: ΔΚΔ – Διοίκησης Καταδρομών – Diikisis Katadromon). Later he joined the Military Music Department of the Cypriot National Guard (SMEF). After his mandatory military service, Roussos left Cyprus for the United States to pursue his education.

Education
Roussos graduated Harvard Business School, the University of Southern California, Musicians Institute and Pepperdine University.

Career
After 2003, Roussos became an investor in new domain names, which he described as virtual real estate. In 2005 he started a global outreach initiative to launch a new top-level domain for the music industry under the brand .MUSIC. On 15 February 2011, Roussos authored an article for the music trade magazine Billboard called "How .music Will Save the Industry."

In 2012, the ICANN new generic Top-Level Domain (gTLD) Program launched and .MUSIC applied for the .music gTLD under the company name DotMusic Limited as a community-based Applicant with support from established institutions associated with the music industry.

Roussos also partnered with Tina Dam to form another TLD-related business with clients such as William Morris Endeavor and News Corp.

Roussos also represented the independent music sector and other associated clearly delineated communities in Community Objections filed with the International Chamber of Commerce against new gTLD applicants (including Google and Amazon) to increase competition, prevent anti-competitive behaviour and ensure appropriate enhanced safeguards are implemented to protect intellectual property owners from cybersquatting, malicious abuse, copyright infringement and piracy. Roussos also represented .MUSIC in Legal Rights Objections filed with the World Intellectual Property Organization against music-themed gTLD Applicants. .MUSIC held registered trademarks in nearly 30 countries for the ".music" and "dotmusic marks" under classification for domain registration and domain name registry services, and management of databases for domain names.

Panels and awards
Roussos has participated in panels at ICANN public meetings, Harvard Business School, the University of Southern California, the University of California Los Angeles, New York University, Georgetown University, Pepperdine University, CMJ, the Future of Music Coalition, Popkomm, SoundCTRL and San Francisco Music Tech. Roussos has received numerous awards, including "Top Business Plan" at the Center of Entrepreneurial Studies at the USC Marshall School of Business.

References

External links
Constantine Roussos' official music site

Cypriot businesspeople
Cypriot musicians
Harvard Business School alumni
Musicians Institute alumni
University of Southern California alumni
Pepperdine University alumni
Living people
Year of birth missing (living people)